The 1941 Campeonato Paulista da Primeira Divisão, organized by the Federação Paulista de Futebol, was the 40th season of São Paulo's top professional football league. Corinthians won the title for the 12th time. no teams were relegated and the top scorer was Corinthians's Teleco with 26 goals.

Championship
The championship was disputed in a double-round robin system, with the team with the most points winning the title.

Top Scores

References

Campeonato Paulista seasons
Paulista